The Guardian Project may refer to:

The Guardian Project (comics), fictional superhero squad created by Stan Lee
Guardian Project (software), open-source software development initiative